Julia Tyler (née Gardiner; May 4, 1820 – July 10, 1889) was the first lady of the United States from June 26, 1844, to March 4, 1845 as the second wife of President John Tyler. A member of the influential Gardiner family, she became a prominent socialite early in life that received many notable figures as suitors. She met the recently-widowed President Tyler in 1842, and she agreed to marry him after he comforted her during her father's death. They married in secret, and she became first lady immediately upon their marriage, serving in the role for the final eight months of his presidency.

Tyler was delighted with her role as first lady, redecorating the White House and establishing her own "court" of ladies-in-waiting to mimic the practices of European monarchies that she had visited years before. She also established the tradition of playing "Hail to the Chief" when the president arrived at an event, and she popularized the waltz and polka dances in the United States. Tyler was a fierce advocate for her husband's political priorities, organizing social events to lobby Congressmen, particularly for the Texas annexation. She is credited with revitalizing the position of first lady, both socially and politically, after several inactive first ladies before her.

After leaving the White House, Tyler moved to the Sherwood Forest Plantation in Virginia with her husband and had seven children. She became a prominent supporter of slavery in the United States, writing an influential pamphlet in 1853 that defended the practice. During the American Civil War, she provided support to the Confederate States of America, creating a permanent rift with her family in New York. After the war, she was involved in a legal dispute regarding her mother's estate with her brother, who had been a loyal Unionist. Tyler returned to Washington in the 1870s as her reputation recovered, assisting first lady Julia Grant at the White House and lobbying Congress to provide a pension for first ladies. She spent her final years in Richmond, Virginia, where she lived in poor health with little money. She died on July 10, 1889 in the same hotel where her husband had died 27 years before.

Early life

Julia Gardiner Tyler was born on May 4, 1820 on New York's Gardiner's Island, one of the largest privately owned islands in the United States. She was the daughter of David Gardiner, a landowner and New York State Senator (1824–1828), and Juliana MacLachlan Gardiner. Her ancestry was Dutch, Scottish, and English, and she was the third of four children. The Gardiners were a wealthy and influential family, and she was taught to value social class and advantageous marriages. She was raised in the town of East Hampton and the small hamlet of Bay Shore. She was educated at home until she was 16 years old, and she then attended the Chagaray Institute in New York where she studied music, French literature, ancient history, arithmetic, and composition.

As a young woman Gardiner was a budding socialite, closely following fashion trends and courting potential suitors. She was introduced in Saratoga Springs, New York at the age of 15. In 1839, she shocked polite society by appearing in a newspaper advertisement for a middle-class department store, posed with an unidentified man and identified as "The Rose of Long Island". Her family took her to Europe, possibly to avoid further publicity, while the nickname "Rose of Long Island" became permanently associated with Gardiner. They first left for London, arriving on October 29, 1840. They visited England, France, Italy, Switzerland, Germany, Holland, Belgium, Ireland, and Scotland before returning to New York in September 1841. While in France, she was presented to the French court, adding to her list of suitors. After returning from Europe, the Gardiners spent time in Washington, D.C.

Courtship and wedding

Courtship with President Tyler 
In Washington, Gardiner and her sister Margaret would accumulate so many suitors that an extra room had to be rented to entertain them. She would continue to make visits to Washington over the following years. She received marriage proposals from several prominent figures, including two congressman and a Supreme Court justice. She would also receive such proposals from President John Tyler.

She first met Tyler on January 20, 1842, when she was 21 years old, being introduced to him at a White House reception. On Gardiner's request, her family spent more time in Washington, returning in 1843. President Tyler invited Gardiner to a private game of cards on February 7, 1843, after which he playfully chased her around the tables. After the death of his first wife, Letitia Christian Tyler, Tyler made it clear that he wished to be romantically involved with Gardiner. Initially, the high-spirited and independent-minded northern beauty felt little attraction to the grave, reserved Virginia gentleman, who was thirty years her senior, though the Gardiners and the Tylers would grow close. The increased time that Gardiner and President Tyler spent together prompted public speculation about their relationship. Tyler first proposed to her at a White House Masquerade Ball on February 22, 1843, when she was 22 years old. She refused that and later proposals he made, though they reached an understanding by the following month that they would someday be wed.

On February 22, 1844, Gardiner, her sister Margaret, and her father joined a presidential excursion on the new steam frigate Princeton. During this excursion, her father, David Gardiner, along with others, lost his life in the explosion of a huge naval gun called the Peacemaker. Gardiner is said to have fainted after learning of her father's death, having President Tyler carry her off of the ship. Gardiner was devastated by the death of her father; she spoke often in later years of how the president's quiet strength sustained her during this difficult time. Tyler comforted Gardiner in her grief and won her consent to a secret engagement, proposing in 1844 at the George Washington Ball. While she grieved for her father, even Gardiner acknowledged that the president had become a surrogate father.

Wedding of Julia Gardiner and John Tyler 
Because of the circumstances surrounding her father's death, the marriage took place with a minimum of celebration. On June 26, 1844, the President slipped into New York City, where the nuptials were performed by Benjamin Treadwell Onderdonk at the Church of the Ascension, not too far from the Gardiner's residence on LaGrange Terrace. President Tyler was 54 years old, while Gardiner was 24. Tyler's oldest daughter, Mary, was 5 years older than her father's new wife. The marriage made Gardiner the first first lady to marry a president who was already in office at the time of the wedding.

The bride's sister, Margaret, and brother, Alexander, were bridesmaid and best man. Only the president's son, John Tyler III, represented the groom's family. Tyler was so concerned about maintaining secrecy that he did not confide his plans to the rest of his children. The news was then broken to the American people, who greeted it with keen interest, much publicity, and some criticism about the couple's 30-year difference in age. Some, such as Representative and former President John Quincy Adams, mocked the president for marrying a young bride so soon after meeting her. Julia Tyler's new stepchildren were dismayed by the marriage, especially as some of them were older than her and that it was so soon after their mother's death. Her stepdaughters in particular were distrustful, though she was ultimately accepted by all of them with the exception of Letitia Semple. After her marriage, Tyler determined that she would give up being a New Yorker and identify instead as a Virginian like her husband.

First Lady of the United States

As the wife of the president, Julia Tyler served as first lady of the United States for the final eight months of his presidency. After a wedding trip to Philadelphia, a White House reception, and a stay at Sherwood Forest, an estate the president had recently acquired for his retirement, the newlyweds returned to Washington D.C. Tyler was enthralled by the crowds that followed them and the public interest in their secret wedding. After arriving at the White House, Tyler sought to make the presidential home more extravagant; she had the building cleaned, the furniture replaced, and the staff uniforms updated. Access to the Gardiner family fortune allowed her to remake the White House more than would have otherwise been possible. She also purchased many elaborate dresses at personal expense, becoming a prominent influence in fashion. The extravagance was muted, however, by her period of mourning for her father. Although her husband was often visibly fatigued, his youthful wife thoroughly enjoyed the duties of first lady.

Tyler did not have strong political views of her own. Rather, she adopted and defended those of her husband. She would encourage her husband to pursue whatever policies he desired, and she would even flatter members of the Senate to win their support. Political considerations were always factored into social events, and Tyler used her influence to exert power in her own right. In particular, she lobbied for the annexation of Texas as she believed it would benefit her husband's legacy. Her open expression of political opinion diverged from previous first ladies, who generally expressed little interest in politics. After the president signed off on the annexation of Texas in one of his final official acts, Tyler began wearing the pen he used around her neck. Her lobbying on the Texas issue is credited as a major factor in its success. Her support for the annexation of Texas became publicly known to the point where she was identified with the topic, and it was the subject of the first political cartoon to tie a first lady to a political issue.

Tyler's sister Margaret would assist her in her duties while visiting Washington, serving as a social secretary. Tyler became a point of contact for those wishing to receive favors from the president, and the Gardiner family in particular regularly sought support from the first lady. Among her favorite requests were those for pardons and commutations by the president, and it was Tyler's interjection that spared "Babe" the pirate from a death sentence in New York. Tyler was often the subject of human-interest stories, particularly those by Washington correspondent F. W. Thomas of the New York Herald. Thomas' coverage of her was consistently positive, and he bestowed upon her the nickname "Lady Presidentress" with which she would be popularly identified.

As first lady, Tyler wished to emulate the customs of European courts. She had her own court formed from her sister, her cousins, and her daughter-in-law to serve as her ladies-in-waiting, and she would invite ladies of prominent families to join her at events and receiving lines. She also kept an Italian Greyhound that accompanied her, which the president had ordered for her from Naples. Her sense of extravagance was also noted when she drove four horses and when she received guests on an armchair that was slightly elevated. To bring an element of grandiose to the presidency, she began the tradition of a presidential anthem, having "Hail to the Chief" played to announce the entry of the president.

Tyler would break social norms by dancing in public, which was considered scandalous at the time. Her love for the polka helped popularize the dance in the United States. She also introduced the waltz to White House events despite the president's previous opposition to dancing. Several "Julia Waltzes" were written in her honor and saw wide success. Though Tyler was generally popular as first lady, her love of drinking and dancing earned her the ire of religious citizens amidst the Second Great Awakening. In the last month of her husband's administration, Tyler hosted a grand White House ball for 3,000 guests where she danced with several important guests.

Post-presidency

Motherhood at Sherwood Forest Plantation 

After leaving the White House, the Tylers retired to the Sherwood Forest Plantation, where they would live until the Civil War. Although a northerner by birth, Mrs. Tyler soon grew accustomed to the leisurely routines of daily life as the wife of a wealthy plantation owner. The Tylers had seven children together after leaving the White House: David Gardiner Tyler in 1846, John Alexander Tyler in 1848, Julia Gardiner Tyler in 1849, Lachlan Tyler in 1851, Lyon Gardiner Tyler in 1853, Robert Fitzwalter Tyler in 1856, and Pearl Tyler in 1860.

Tyler was responsible for the care of not only her seven children, but several of her adult stepchildren, their two hired workers, and approximately 70 slaves that were made to work on the plantation. Tyler often hosted social gatherings and long-term guests at their home, and the family regularly traveled throughout the United States for vacation and for speaking engagements. She also carried out renovations on their home, their boat, and their carriage. Tyler eventually bought the Villa Margaret summer home in Hampton, Virginia to accommodate their growing family. The Tylers spent beyond their means, depleting the Gardiner fortune and plunging them into financial trouble for much of their marriage.

In 1853, Tyler wrote a defense of slavery titled "The Women of England vs. the Women of America", in response to the "Stafford House Address" petition against slavery which the Duchess of Sutherland had helped to organize. In her defense of slavery, Tyler made several false claims to suggest that slaves lived comfortably in the United States. Such a public expression of political opinion was unusual for a woman in the Southern United States, but the nature of the slavery debate won acceptance for her essay among the South. In the North, she was regarded as a doughface, a disparaging term for a Northerner that supported the South. In response to Tyler's essay, Harriet Jacobs, a former slave and later abolitionist writer, authored her first published work, a letter to the New York Tribune in 1853.

Civil War 
As states began to secede in the buildup to the Civil War, the Tylers advocated the preservation of the union. They went to Washington in early 1861 to alleviate the crisis, with Tyler involving herself in the city's social life to help improve Northern–Southern relations. By February, however, Tyler and her husband accepted secession and aligned themselves with the Confederate States of America. She volunteered to support the Confederate war effort during the civil war, and she cut ties with her family in New York when they remained loyal to the Union. She became further opposed to the Union after Union soldiers captured her summer home Villa Margaret.

Worrying for her husband's health while he was away, Tyler joined him at the Confederate House of Representatives, and he died days later on January 18, 1862. As Tyler was a former first lady, Union soldiers did not seize their home at Sherwood Forest Plantation, but her slaves began to leave. Tyler ultimately lost her 60 slaves and 1,100 acres of land due to military events. She moved north to her family home in Staten Island with several of her children, but family relations were so strained that her brother David refused to travel to Virginia to escort her to New York. Tyler eventually returned to the Sherwood Forest Plantation, where she hired a manager and two employees to tend to it. With her two youngest children, she traveled to Bermuda where she lived with other Confederates that had settled there. She returned to Staten Island in November 1862 She bitterly argued with her Unionist brother, who was eventually banished from the house after striking her. Tyler was upset to hear that Sherwood Forest Plantation had been captured while she was in New York, that her former slaves had been given the crops that they grew, and that the building was being used as a desegregated school.

Tyler continued to support the Confederacy throughout the war, making donations to the Confederate Army and distributing pamphlets in support of the cause. The day after the assassination of President Abraham Lincoln, three men broke into her home demanding that she turn over her Confederate flag, searching for it and seizing it after she denied having one. She blamed her brother of orchestrating the attack. The Tylers remained unpopular after the war for supporting the Confederacy, so the Tyler children were sent out of the country for schooling.

Later life and death 

In 1865, Tyler's brother David sued to prevent her from inheriting the bulk of their mother's estate valued at $180,000, charging that she had exerted "undue influences" on their mother to execute a will despite her "mental incapacity". The court supported his claim on August 25 and refused to accept the will. After two appeals, David Gardiner won the case in 1867. David then asked the courts to partition the estate as if no will existed. Tyler asked for a jury trial on the issue, and the jury declined to consider the contested will as an argument in her favor. Tyler was also involved in a separate legal battle to regain her summerhouse Villa Margaret, which she would eventually win back in 1869. After trying to sell it to President Ulysses S. Grant, she was forced to sell Villa Margaret at a loss. She resided at the Gardiner-Tyler House from 1868 to 1874.

Tyler resumed her socialite status in Washington in the 1870s as the stigma of her Confederate sympathies subsided. She would sometimes tend to White House events, supporting first lady Julia Grant as hostess. In 1870, Tyler donated a portrait of herself to the White House, starting the first ladies portrait collection. In 1872, Tyler moved to Georgetown. She and her daughter Pearl both converted to Roman Catholicism and were conditionally baptized in May 1872. The depression that followed the Panic of 1873 depleted her finances, forcing her to move back to Sherwood Forest Plantation and to sell all of her other properties. She lobbied Congress for a pension and was granted a monthly allowance in 1880. Following the assassination of President James Garfield in 1881, Congress granted an annual pension of $5,000 to widows of former presidents. Her residence is listed as Williams Landing in Hamilton County, Tennessee on page 342 of the 'List of Pensioners on the Roll, January 1, 1883' where she is shown as receiving $416.66 per month as a widow.

In 1882, Tyler moved to Richmond, Virginia. Toward the end of her life, she suffered from malaria. She made her final visit to Washington in 1887, when she met with first lady Frances Cleveland, to whom she would sometimes provide advise. Tyler suffered a stroke in Richmond and died there at the Exchange Hotel on July 10, 1889, aged 69. Her husband had died of a stroke 27 years earlier in the same hotel. She was buried next to him at Hollywood Cemetery in Richmond. She had lived the longest post White House life of any first lady, living another 44 years after leaving the White House. She would hold this record until it was overtaken by Frances Cleveland. Her funeral was held in Richmond at St. Peter's Cathedral on July 12, 1889, and was attended by Governor Fitzhugh Lee and Mayor James Taylor Ellyson, with the absolution performed by Bishop Augustine Van de Vyver.

Legacy
The papers of the Tyler family, including Julia Gardiner Tyler, are held by the Special Collections Research Center at the College of William and Mary. Many of these papers have not been incorporated into historical analysis of Julia Tyler as of 2016. Tyler's son Lyon, like his father, married his second wife late in life. As a result, Julia Tyler had two grandsons that survived into the 21st century: one died in September 2020, while Harrison Ruffin Tyler was still alive as of that date.

Tyler was generally well received during her time as first lady, and she is credited with restoring the Washington social world after the death of her husband's first wife. She also provided a level of extravagance to the presidency, but she did little to change or expand the substance of the role of first lady. Instead, she strongly affected the role's imagery, incorporating regal elements. She is recognized as one of the most successful hostesses in the history of the White House, and she was one of the earliest first ladies to be directly active in politics. Her prominence in Washington has prompted greater historical interest in her life compared to the less active presidential wives that immediately preceded her.

Regard by historians 
Since 1982 Siena College Research Institute has periodically conducted surveys asking historians to assess American first ladies according to a cumulative score on the independent criteria of their background, value to the country, intelligence, courage, accomplishments, integrity, leadership, being their own women, public image, and value to the president. Consistently, Tyler has been ranked in the lower half of first ladies by historians in these surveys. In terms of cumulative assessment, Tyler has been ranked:
27th of 42 in 1982
27th of 37 in 1993
26th of 38 in 2003
28th of 38 in 2008
27th of 39 in 2014

In the 2014 survey, Tyler and her husband were ranked the 34th out of 39 first couples in terms of being a "power couple".

References

Further reading

External links
The Tyler Courtship and Wedding
Finding aid for the Tyler Family Papers, Group A
Julia Tyler at C-SPAN's First Ladies: Influence & Image

1820 births
1889 deaths
19th-century American women
19th-century Roman Catholics
American people of Dutch descent
American people of English descent
American people of Scottish descent
Burials at Hollywood Cemetery (Richmond, Virginia)
Converts to Roman Catholicism from Calvinism
First ladies of the United States
Gardiner family
Julia Tyler
People from Bay Shore, New York
People from Charles City County, Virginia
People from East Hampton (town), New York
People from Richmond, Virginia
People from Staten Island
American proslavery activists
Catholics from Virginia
Catholics from New York (state)
People from West New Brighton, Staten Island